The Anwar Ibrahim cabinet is the current federal cabinet of Malaysia, formed on 3 December 2022, eight days after Anwar Ibrahim took office as the 10th Prime Minister of Malaysia. The composition of the cabinet was announced a day earlier on 2 December 2022, consisting of almost all parties represented in the 15th Parliament. Although Perikatan Nasional was also invited to join the government, it decided to reject the offer and instead formed the federal opposition. The governing parties have named this cabinet the "Unity Government Cabinet" (Malay: Kabinet Kerajaan Perpaduan) despite it not technically being a unity government.

Composition

Ministers
As of 3 December 2022, the ministers have been:

Deputy Ministers 
The following lists deputy ministers. 

{| class="sortable wikitable"
|-
! Portfolio
! Officeholder
! colspan=2|Party
! Constituency
! Took office
! Left office
|-
| rowspan="2" |Deputy Minister in the Prime Minister's Department
|Ramkarpal Singh Karpal Singh (Law and Institutional Reform)
|bgcolor="" |
|PH (DAP)
|Bukit Gelugor
| rowspan="27" |10 December 2022
| rowspan="27" |Incumbent
|-
|Datuk Wilson Ugak Kumbong (Sabah, Sarawak Affairs and Special Functions)
|bgcolor="" |
|GPS (PRS)
|Hulu Rajang
|-
| rowspan="2" |Deputy Minister of Finance
|Datuk Seri Haji Ahmad Maslan 
|bgcolor="" |
|BN (UMNO)
|Pontian
|-
|Steven Sim Chee Keong 
|bgcolor="" |
|PH (DAP)
|Bukit Mertajam
|-
|Deputy Minister of Economy
|Dato Hajah Hanifah Hajar Taib 
|bgcolor="" |
|GPS (PBB)
|Mukah
|-
|Deputy Minister of Defence
|Adly Zahari   
|bgcolor="" |
|PH (AMANAH)
|Alor Gajah
|-
|Deputy Minister of Home Affairs
|Datuk Seri Dr. Shamsul Anuar Nasarah 
|bgcolor="" |
|BN (UMNO)
|Lenggong
|-
|Deputy Minister of International Trade and Industry
|Liew Chin Tong   
|bgcolor="" |
|PH (DAP)
|Iskandar Puteri
|-
|Deputy Minister of Education
|Lim Hui Ying 
|bgcolor="" |
|PH (DAP)
|Tanjong
|-
|Deputy Minister of Transport
|Datuk Haji Hasbi Habibollah 
|bgcolor="" |
|GPS (PBB)
|Limbang
|-
|Deputy Minister of Agriculture and Food Security
|Chan Foong Hin |bgcolor="" |
|PH (DAP)
|Kota Kinabalu
|-
|Deputy Minister of Health
|Lukanisman Awang Sauni |bgcolor="" |
|GPS (PBB)
|Sibuti
|-
|Deputy Minister of Tourism, Arts and Culture
|Khairul Firdaus Akbar Khan |bgcolor="" |
|GRS
|Batu Sapi
|-
|Deputy Minister of Local Government Development
|Haji Akmal Nasrullah Mohd. Nasir |bgcolor="" |
|PH (PKR)
|Johor Bahru
|-
|Deputy Minister of Foreign Affairs
|Datuk Mohamad Alamin |bgcolor="" |
|BN (UMNO)
|Kimanis
|-
|Deputy Minister of Higher Education
|Dato' Haji Mohammad Yusof Apdal |bgcolor="" |
|WARISAN
|Lahad Datu
|-
|Deputy Minister of Human Resources
|Mustapha Sakmud |bgcolor="" |
|PH (PKR)
|Sepanggar
|-
|Deputy Minister of Domestic Trade and Cost of Living
|Senator Hajah Fuziah Salleh|bgcolor="" |
|PH (PKR)
|Senator
|-
|Deputy Minister of Entrepreneur Development and Cooperatives
|Senator Saraswathy Kandasami|bgcolor="" |
|PH (PKR)
|Senator
|-
|Deputy Minister of Rural and Regional Development
|Datuk Hajah Rubiah Wang |bgcolor="" |
|GPS (PBB)
|Kota Samarahan
|-
|Deputy Minister of Works
|Dato' Sri Abdul Rahman Mohamad |bgcolor="" |
|BN (UMNO)
|Lipis
|-
|Deputy Minister of Science, Technology and Innovation
|Datuk Arthur Joseph Kurup |bgcolor="" |
|BN (PBRS)
|Pensiangan
|-
|Deputy Minister of Natural Resources, Environment and Climate Change
|Dato' Sri Huang Tiong Sii   
|bgcolor="" |
|GPS (SUPP)
|Sarikei
|-
|Deputy Minister of Plantation and Commodities
|Datuk Hajah Siti Aminah Aching |bgcolor="" |
|BN (UMNO)
|Beaufort
|-
|Deputy Minister of Women, Family and Community Development
|Aiman Athirah Sabu |bgcolor="" |
|PH (AMANAH)
|Sepang
|-
|Deputy Minister of Youth and Sports
|Adam Adli Abdul Halim |bgcolor="" |
|PH (PKR)
|Hang Tuah Jaya
|-
|Deputy Minister of Communications and Digital
|Teo Nie Ching '|bgcolor="" |
|PH (DAP)
|Kulai
|-
|}

 Changes 
Under this cabinet:
 The number of Deputy Prime Ministers increased from one to two.
 The number of Deputy Ministers of several ministries decreased from two to one.
 No Deputy Ministers for Ministry of National Unity and for the Minister in the Prime Minister' Department (Religious Affairs).
 Ministry of Agriculture and Food Industries was renamed to Ministry of Agriculture and Food Security.
 Ministry of Communication and Multimedia was renamed to Ministry of Communication and Digital.
 Ministry of Domestic Trade and Consumer Affairs was renamed to Ministry of Domestic Trade and Living Costs.
 Ministry of Energy and Natural Resources and Ministry of Environment and Water were merged into a single ministry named Ministry of Natural Resources, Environment and Climate Change.
 Ministry of Federal Territories was transferred the Prime Minister's Department as a portfolio and a department under the Prime Minister.
 Ministry of Housing and Local Government was renamed to Ministry of Local Government Development. Housing portfolio remains in this ministry for now.
 Ministry of Rural Development was renamed to Ministry of Rural and Regional Development.
 Economic affairs portfolio under the Prime Minister's Department was transferred to the returning Ministry of Economy''. It was previously the Ministry of Economic Affairs under the seventh Mahathir cabinet.

Unity Government Secretariat

The Unity Government formed a secretariat to coordinate the activities of its component coalitions and parties in February 2023. Barisan Nasional chair Ahmad Zahid Hamidi told the press that the inaugural meeting of the secretariat would focus on finding common ground between the manifestos of the different components and strengthening the existing government. Anwar's attendance at the inaugural secretariat meeting marked the first time he had returned to UMNO party headquarters in over 20 years, after his sacking from Umno and removal from government positions in 1998 sparked the Reformasi movement. Anthony Loke's attendance also marked the first time a Democratic Action Party leader had visited the UMNO headquarters.

Anwar subsequently announced the secretariat would form three committees: an elections committee, a strategy committee, and a government and political agenda monitoring committee. Deputy Prime Minister Fadillah Yusoff serves as secretary general of the secretariat, while UMNO Youth leader Asyraf Wajdi Dusuki is its chief secretary. The members of the secretariat are:

 Pakatan Harapan (PH)
 Anwar Ibrahim
 Saifuddin Nasution
 Mohamad Sabu
 Anthony Loke Siew Fook
 Ewon Benedick
 Rafizi Ramli
 Salahuddin Ayub
 Fahmi Fadzil
 Adly Zahari

 Barisan Nasional (BN)
 Ahmad Zahid Hamidi
 Wee Ka Siong
 Vigneswaran Sanasee
 Arthur Joseph Kurup
 Mohamad Hasan
 Zambry Abdul Kadir
 Asyraf Wajdi Dusuki

 Gabungan Parti Sarawak (GPS)
 Abang Johari Openg
 Fadillah Yusof
 Alexander Nanta Linggi
 Tiong King Sing
 Sim Kui Hian
 Joseph Salang Gandum

 Gabungan Rakyat Sabah (GRS)
 Pandikar Amin Mulia
 Maximus Ongkili
 Armizan Mohd Ali
 Edward Linggu Bukut

 Parti Warisan
 Shafie Apdal
 Darell Leiking
 Azis Jamman
 Loretto Padua Jr.

References

Cabinets established in 2022
2022 establishments in Malaysia
Cabinet of Malaysia
Current governments